Elena Florea may refer to
Elena Horvat (born 1958), Romanian rower
Elena Murgoci (1960–1999), Romanian long-distance runner